The Principal Secretary to the Prime Minister of Pakistan (also referred to as PSPM or PM's Chief of Staff) is the administrative head and highest-ranking official of the Prime Minister's Office. The position holder is usually an officer belonging to the Pakistan Administrative Service serving in BPS-22 grade. The Principal Secretary advises and assists the Prime Minister on all the official business routed through the PM Office, and because of this the PSPM is generally regarded as the most crucial aide to the Prime Minister. The current Principal Secretary to the Prime Minister is Syed Tauqir Shah.

Being the administrative head of the Prime Minister's Office, the Principal Secretary wields significant amount of power over the daily affairs of the Government of Pakistan. The duties of the Principal Secretary includes, but are not limited to; advising the Prime Minister on national policy and its implementation, dealing with official paperwork in the Prime Minister's Office, placing before the Prime Minister critical files of importance for approval, coordinating activities in the Prime Minister's Office, and preparing notes on issues to be discussed by the PM with senior politicians, bureaucrats and other dignitaries.

List of principal secretaries to PM

See also
Principal Secretary to the President of Pakistan
Government of Pakistan
Federal Secretary
Interior Secretary of Pakistan
Finance Secretary of Pakistan

References

Federal government ministries of Pakistan